Cēsis Municipality is a municipality in Vidzeme, Latvia. The municipality was formed in 2009 by merging Vaive parish and Cēsis town, which became the administrative centre. As of 2020, the population was 16,291. 

On 1 July 2021, Cēsis Municipality was enlarged when Amata Municipality, Jaunpiebalga Municipality, Līgatne Municipality, Pārgauja Municipality, Priekuļi Municipality and Vecpiebalga Municipality were merged into it. 

The territory of Cēsis Municipality is defined by law as a part of the region of Vidzeme.

Subdivisions 
After the 2021 merger, Cēsis Municipality consists of the following subunits: 

 Amata Parish
 Cēsis city
 Drabeši Parish
 Dzērbene Parish
 Ineši Parish
 Jaunpiebalga Parish
 Kaive Parish
 Liepa Parish
 Līgatne Parish
 Mārsnēni Parish
 Nītaure Parish
 Priekuļi Parish
 Raiskums Parish
 Skujene Parish
 Stalbe Parish
 Straupe Parish
 Taurene Parish
 Vaive Parish
 Vecpiebalga Parish
 Veselava Parish
 Zaube Parish
 Zosēni Parish

Twin towns — sister cities

Cēsis is twinned with:

 Achim, Germany
 Baku, Azerbaijan
 Gatchinsky District, Russia
 Konstancin-Jeziorna, Poland
 Rakvere, Estonia
 Rokiškis, Lithuania
 Tyresö, Sweden
 Zhovkva, Ukraine

Images

See also
Administrative divisions of Latvia (2009)

References

 
Municipalities of Latvia
Vidzeme